Behzad Khodadad Kanjobeh (born April 25, 1981 in Tehran, Iran) is an Iranian Taekwondo athlete. He is the 2001 world champion.

References

 www.taekwondoplayers.20m.com

External links
 
 khodadad's Instagram- page

Iranian male taekwondo practitioners
1981 births
Living people
Asian Games silver medalists for Iran
Asian Games bronze medalists for Iran
Asian Games medalists in taekwondo
Taekwondo practitioners at the 2002 Asian Games
Taekwondo practitioners at the 2006 Asian Games
Medalists at the 2002 Asian Games
Medalists at the 2006 Asian Games
Universiade medalists in taekwondo
Universiade silver medalists for Iran
Universiade bronze medalists for Iran
World Taekwondo Championships medalists
Asian Taekwondo Championships medalists
Medalists at the 2003 Summer Universiade
Medalists at the 2005 Summer Universiade
20th-century Iranian people
21st-century Iranian people